Traffic is the second studio album by the English rock band of the same name, released in 1968 on Island Records in the United Kingdom as ILPS 9081T (stereo), and United Artists in the United States, as UAS 6676 (stereo). The album peaked at number 9 in the UK albums chart and at number 17 on the Billboard 200. It was the last album recorded by the group before their initial breakup.

Background and content
In January 1968, after some initial success in Britain with their debut album Mr. Fantasy, Dave Mason had departed from the group. He produced the debut album by the group Family, containing in its ranks future Traffic bass player Ric Grech, while Traffic went on the road. In May, the band had invited Mason back to begin recording the new album.

The album was somewhat of a departure from the psychedelia of Traffic's debut, featuring a more eclectic display of influences from blues to folk and jazz. Mason ended up writing and singing half of the songs on the album (including his biggest hit "Feelin' Alright?"), but making scant contribution to the songs written by Jim Capaldi and Steve Winwood. His flair for pop melody had always been at odds with the others' jazz ambitions, evidenced by the dichotomy seen for the songs on this album, and by October he was again out of the band. He would return one more time for a tour and album in 1971 to run out the band's contract.

Traffic was reissued for compact disc in the UK on 11 January 2000, with five bonus tracks, two from the soundtrack to the United Artists film Here We Go Round the Mulberry Bush and three from Last Exit. In the US, the remastered reissue of 27 February 2001 included mono single mixes of "You Can All Join In" and "Feelin' Alright?," and the stereo single mix of "Withering Tree." The original album was produced by Jimmy Miller. The remasters were assisted in their production by Jim Capaldi.

Reception

AllMusic gave a positive retrospective review of the album, commenting that it achieved a strong balance between Dave Mason's simple and straightforward folk-rock songs and Steve Winwood's complex and often haunting rock jams.

It was voted number 312 in Colin Larkin's All Time Top 1000 Albums 3rd Edition (2000).

Track listing and personnel

Additional personnel
 Terry Brown, Eddie Kramer, Glyn Johns, Brian Humphries – sound engineers
 Richard Polak, Gered Mankowitz – photography

Notes

References

External links
[ Traffic's Traffic] at allmusic.com
Traffic at JimCapaldi.com
Traffic at Music.com

Traffic (band) albums
1968 albums
Albums produced by Jimmy Miller
Island Records albums
Polydor Records albums
United Artists Records albums
Albums recorded at Olympic Sound Studios

nl:Traffic (album)